Terrence Scammell (born 1 March 1937) is a British stage and television actor. In his early career, he performed extensively at the renowned American Shakespeare Festival in Stratford, Connecticut, including a starring role as Romeo in Shakespeare's Romeo and Juliet. He was also a founder and artistic director of the Los Angeles Free Shakespeare Festival.

He has also worked in television and film, with credits on mini-series such as Around the World in 80 Days and Kidnapped, and films such as The Mephisto Waltz and The Lindbergh Kidnapping Case.

Stage 
 Artistic Director/Founder, Los Angeles Free Shakespeare Festival, Los Angeles (1975-?)
 A Comedy of Errors, 1968
 King Lear—1st Volscian Lieutenant (American Shakespeare Theater, Stratford, Connecticut, 1965)
 Romeo and Juliet (1965)—Romeo (American Shakespeare Theater, Stratford, Connecticut, 1965)
 Review from A Shakespeare Encyclopedia 
 "Shakespearean Prep School"—pictorial feature in The Free-Lance Star (Fredericksburg, VA), March 15, 1966

Film and television 

 Around the World in 80 Days (1989)—Grimes (3 episodes)
 Dallas (1985)—Brad English (1 episode)
 Kidnapped (1978)—Duncansby (2 episodes)
 The Lindbergh Kidnapping Case (1976)—Pound
 The Mephisto Waltz (1971)—Richard
 Murder, She Wrote (1985)—Director (1 episode)
 Police Story
 Yesterday's Child (1977)—Noel Talbot
 The Young Rebels (1970)—Captain Smythe

References

1937 births
Male actors from London
English male film actors
English male television actors
Living people